Johann Baptist Walpoth (Urtijëi, 25 January 1911 - Urtijëi, 2 September 1934) was an Austrian sculptor.

Biography 
Johann Baptist Walpoth, also called Batista da Lësc, was born in the Junerëi farm, son of Luis Walpoth sculptor and Katherina Bernardi da Lësc, a seamstress specialized in making costumes typical of Val Gardena. Walpoth was born into a family of artists such as his sister Cristina, a polychromatic-gilder. Walpoth was initiated into wood carving in the workshop of Vinzenz Moroder-Scurcià and attended the Urtijëi School of Art,  directed at the time by Guido Balsamo Stella, where he had also attended the modeling course held by Ludwig Moroder-Lenert. In 1934 he worked in Luis Insam-Tavella's workshop. He died following a hunting accident in the Resciesa woods in Urtijëi.

Works 

 The crucifix of Mount Sëura Sas, carved in wood on the mountain itself with Vincenzo Peristi, currently exhibited in the Museum of Val Gardena in Urtijëi.
 A statue of a mountain guide and a crucifix purchased by the Duchess of Pistoia, Lydia of Arenberg, wife of Filiberto of Savoia.

Galleria di opere

References

Sister projects 

  Wikimedia Commons contiene immagini o altri file su Johann Baptist Walpoth

Austrian sculptors
1934 deaths
1911 births
Woodcarving